= Up & Running =

British retailing group

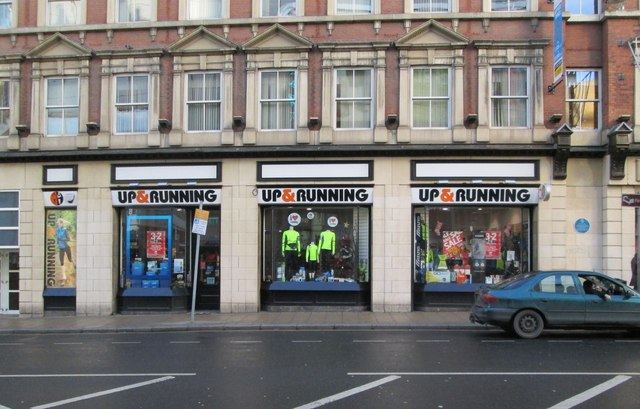
- Branch in Leeds
- Type: Ltd.
- Industry: Retailing
- Founded: 1992
- Headquarters: Harrogate, North Yorkshire United Kingdom
- Key people: Dennis Macfarlane (Managing Director) Gillian Macfarlane (Managing Director)
- Products: Running shoes, clothing, accessories & electronics
- Number of employees: 200

Up & Running (UK) Limited is a British retailing group. Established in Harrogate, North Yorkshire, in 1992 by Gillian and Dennis Macfarlane, the company operates 29 stores across the United Kingdom.

== Awards ==
Since the first opening of Up and Running, the company has been recognised with a number of industry awards, showcasing their presence within the running community. In 2006, the company was on The Sunday Times' 2006 Fast Track of Britain's private companies with the fastest growing sales. At the 2018 Running Awards, Up and Running achieved a Gold Award for Best National Retailer and a Bronze Award for Online Retailer. In 2019, the company received Gold Awards for National Retailer and Customer Service Multi Brand and a Bronze Award for Online Retailer Multi Brand.
